The 2012 UCF Knights football team represented the University of Central Florida in the 2012 NCAA Division I FBS football season. The Knights played in the Eastern Division of Conference USA and played their home games at Bright House Networks Stadium in Orlando, Florida. The Knights were led by head coach George O'Leary, who was in his ninth season with the team.

The 2012 season marked UCF's last as a member of Conference USA, as the Knights moved to the American Athletic Conference in 2013. UCF was originally barred from postseason play for the season due to recruiting violations in both football and basketball under previous athletic director Keith Tribble. The university had its appeal delayed until 2013 and was bowl-eligible for 2012. For the fourth time as C-USA members, UCF won the Conference USA Eastern Division, though the Knights lost the Conference USA Championship game to Tulsa. As a result, the Knights appeared in the Beef 'O' Brady's Bowl, in which they defeated Ball State, 38–17, for the second bowl victory in program history. The Knights finished the season receiving votes both in the AP and Coaches polls.

All games were broadcast live on the UCF-IMG radio network. The Knights' flagship station was WYGM "740 The Game" in Orlando.

Personnel

Coaching staff

Roster

Recruiting class

Schedule

Game summaries

Akron

Ohio State

FIU

Missouri

East Carolina

Southern Miss

Memphis

Marshall

SMU

UTEP

Tulsa

UAB

Conference USA Championship Game

Beef 'O' Brady's Bowl

References

UCF
UCF Knights football seasons
Gasparilla Bowl champion seasons
UCF Knights football